Gen. Muhoozi Kainerugaba (born 24 April 1974) is an Ugandan general and son of president Yoweri Museveni. He has been commander of the Special Forces Command (SFC) from 2008 to 2017, and again from December 2020 to 2021, then commander of the land forces of the Uganda People's Defence Force (UPDF) from 24 June 2021 to 4 October 2022, when he was removed following tweets claiming to be able to capture Nairobi. Both the UPDF and the SFC are accused of using excessive force, as well as abductions; Muhoozi and other senior officials are mentioned in an International Criminal Court complaint. In 2017, Muhoozi was appointed Presidential Adviser, fueling speculations he was being prepared for the presidency. He announced he was running for the office on 15 March 2023, despite his father also indicating he would run for re-election.

On 30 November 2021, Uganda and the Democratic Republic of Congo launched a joint military offensive in Eastern Congo dubbed 'Operation Shujaa', led by Muhoozi. The stated reason is to fight against the Ugandan rebel group Allied Democratic Forces (ADF).

Family
Muhoozi Kainerugaba was born on 24 April 1974 in Dar es Salaam, Tanzania, to Yoweri Museveni and Janet Museveni. His father has been President of Uganda since 1986 during his time with FRONASA, a guerrilla outfit he led during the fight against Idi Amin’s dictatorial government by exiles based in Tanzania.

Raised in a Christian family, Muhoozi became born-again in his early years (secondary school).
In 1999, Muhoozi married Charlotte Nankunda Kutesa.

Education 
As a child, Muhoozi attended schools in Tanzania, Mount Kenya Academy in Nyeri Kenya, and Sweden. After his father became President of Uganda in 1986, he attended Kampala Parents School, King's College Budo, and St. Mary's College Kisubi. He graduated in 1994.

Muhoozi was admitted to the Egyptian Military Academy where he took both the company and battalion commanders courses. He also has attended the Kalama Armoured Warfare Training School.
In 2007 he was admitted to a one-year course at the United States Army Command and General Staff College at Fort Leavenworth, Kansas, graduating in June 2008. Following that, he successfully completed the Executive National Security Programme at the South African National Defence College.

Muhoozi does not hold a degree in any verifiable non-military post-secondary education. It is not clear whether he was able to graduate from the University of Nottingham where some sources indicate he had a two-year study period for a "BA Political Science" degree starting 1996 to 1998, but the program is three years, not two.

Career

In 1999, Muhoozi joined the Uganda People's Defence Force (UPDF) at the rank of officer cadet and graduated in 2000 from the Royal Military Academy Sandhurst, the British Army’s officer training school. He quickly made promotion within UPDF although many of Museveni's former NRA comrades such as David Sejusa and Kizza Besigye opposed this.

In September 2011 Muhoozi was promoted to Colonel. In early 2012 Muhoozi enrolled at the South African National Defence College for the Executive National Security Program. In August 2012 he was promoted to Brigadier General and appointed Commander Special Forces Command. In 2013 and 2014 Muhoozi was one of the senior UPDF commanders who deployed to South Sudan to support the Government of South Sudan after fighting broke out in Juba between rival factions of the SPLA. 

In 2017 Muhoozi was appointed Senior Presidential Advisor on Special Duties, a position he held until December 2020.
He has been commander of the Special Forces Command (SFC) from 2008 to 2017, and again from December 2020 to 2021,
In February 2019, President Museveni, Muhoozi's father, promoted him to the rank of colonel, the second-highest rank in the UPDF army after general.

In June 2021, Muhoozi was appointed Commander of UPDF Land Forces, taking over from Lt. Gen. Peter Elwelu who is now his deputy. Elwelu is known to have commanded the infamous raid on the Rwenzururu palace in Western Uganda in November 2016 in which he ordered UPDF to open fire on Rwenzururu royal guards, killing more than 100 of them.

Project Muhoozi, 2013 
In 2013, General David Sejusa Tinyefuza wrote a letter in which he explained a plan with the intention of having Muhoozi succeed his father as president. Army officers opposed to it were at risk of being assassinated. Sejusa told the BBC that Uganda was being turned into a "political monarchy," which Muhoozi denied. The letter led to the government's most aggressive attack on the media. The police laid siege to the Daily Monitor for more than 10 days, while many in Uganda were surprised by the silence of the international community. Tinyefuza spent over a year in exile in the United Kingdom before he returned. He was later arrested for insubordination in 2016. The term 'Muhoozi project' is no longer a taboo and even used frequently by Muhoozi fans on social media.

Uganda–Rwanda conflict, 2018-2022 
In February 2019, Rwanda closed the border accusing Uganda of supporting rebel groups in order to destabilize Rwanda. Uganda accused the Rwanda government of spying. In 2019 Rwanda’s key demands included Uganda ceasing to host anti-Kigali elements and the release of its abducted citizens. In 2022, Muhoozi took on a task that Angola’s President João Manuel Lourenço and Democratic Republic of Congo’s Félix Tshisekedi failed to accomplish in 2019, when they facilitated four meetings between Paul Kagame and Museveni.  Rwanda’s main Gatuna border post between the two countries reopened in late January, following a meeting between Kagame and Muhoozi.

Muhoozi as commander of SFC 
Muhoozi has been commander of the Special Forces Command (SFC) from 2008 to 2017, and again from December 2020 to 2021, then commander of the land forces of the Uganda People's Defence Force (UPDF) from 24 June 2021 to 4 October 2022, when he was removed following tweets claiming to be able to capture Nairobi.The SFC has been criticised for the extrajudicial abductions, tortures, disappearances and killings of political opposition. In his role as commander of the SFC, Kainerugaba has been named in a complaint to the International Criminal Court.

In 2007 he commanded the decisive defeat of the ADF in Bundibugyo, in an operation where 80 enemy forces and the ADF’s third in command were killed in action.

In 2008 he was deployed as Second-In-Command of “Operation Lightening Thunder” in the Democratic Republic of the Congo. This successful operation was organized to degrade the combat capacities of the rebel Lord’s Resistance Army in Garamba, deep in the jungles of the DR Congo.

In 2009 he participated in training and commissioning the UPDF’s first paratrooper element. Uganda’s first paratroopers since 1976.

Controversies 
On 31 December 2020, three days after being re-appointed SFC commander, Muhoozi posted a number of tweets attacking Bobi Wine; the tweets were considered by many Ugandans to promote tribalism. After many negative reactions, he removed the tweets.

A US$17 million tender contract to deliver medical oxygen was awarded to Muhoozi's wife Charlotte's company Silverbacks, leading to accusations of corruption. During the COVID-19 outbreak of June 2021, oxygen production struggled, causing many COVID-19 patients to die of oxygen shortages.

On 28 December 2021 Ugandan security forces put under house arrest, and subsequently arrested, journalist and writer Kakwenza Rukira after he had insulted Muhoozi on Twitter. During the period he was tortured Kakwenza allegedly had three meetings with Muhoozi in which he had to apologize for the tweets.

When Muhoozi was still an active serving officer in the UPDF, some had criticized his latest active involvement in politics and taking on roles typically meant for civilian diplomats as breaking the UPDF code of conduct for a serving officer. For instance, he played an active role in the mending of the Rwanda-Uganda relationship culminating in the successful re-opening of Uganda's border with Rwanda. Active serving military personnel are barred from engaging in active political roles in Uganda, according to UPDF rules.

Moreover, Muhoozi is known to enjoy alcoholic beverages and as such, he has been criticized about tweeting while drunk and posting often controversial tweets. It is also stated in the UPDF Act 7 of 2005, under Disgraceful conduct, section 139, that, "A person in the Defence Forces who is drunk, whether or not on duty, commits an offence and is on conviction, liable to imprisonment not exceeding seven years." No case has been brought to the UPDF court martial's attention about Muhoozi's behavior as a drunk serving officer.

In February 2022, he expressed support for Russia's invasion of Ukraine and wrote that Russian President Vladimir Putin "is absolutely right!".

In May 2022, Muhoozi praised former U.S. President Donald Trump, describing him as the "only white man I have ever respected".

In October 2022, Muhoozi received attention for publicly offering 100 cows as a bride price for Italian politician Giorgia Meloni, who at that point was widely expected to become the next Prime Minister of Italy, threatening to conquer Rome if this bride price were rebuffed.

On 3 October 2022, Muhoozi caused a diplomatic incident with Kenya when, on Twitter, he threatened to invade the country and conquer Nairobi, forcing his father to apologise for the comments. 
On 4 October 2022, following the controversy with Kenya, Muhoozi was removed from the UPDF lead.

Twitter use
Having been previously known to be generally a silent observer on Uganda's political scene, Muhoozi has recently taken to Twitter, suddenly becoming outspoken on a number of socio-political issues in Uganda, but mostly in praise of the UPDF which he hails as 'the greatest Army in the world'. In a 2013 speech to the UPDF High Command, President Museveni said this of the then Brig. Muhoozi, '“I am most pleased that Muhoozi has turned out to be a very serious officer, quiet and devoted to the building of the army" in reference to Muhoozi's work in building the Special Forces Command. Muhoozi has been dubbed by some in the media as the 'tweeting General' in reference to his sudden prolific use of Twitter, frequently posting content that some do not view as befitting of someone of his rank and position in the Army and in Uganda's social sphere.

Through Twitter, Muhoozi has actively commented on Uganda's fractured relationship with Rwanda promising to speak with his 'uncle' President Paul Kagame of Rwanda to allow for the re-opening of the Rwanda-Uganda border. The Rwanda-Uganda border was closed by Rwanda in 2019 in a diplomatic protest accusing Uganda of harboring and supporting elements Kigali considered active in attempting to destabilize Rwanda. On March 6, 2022, Muhoozi took to Twitter to announce that the Rwanda-Uganda border would be fully re-opened on March 7, 2022, after several diplomatic engagements that saw Muhoozi travel to Kigali twice in early 2022. He said in praise of the successful negotiations to re-open the border, "The border is fully opening tomorrow. Me and my uncle (President Kagame) achieved in 7 hours what all the diplomats on earth failed to achieve. I think we need a prize."

On 12 April 2022, Muhoozi de-activated his Twitter account. He returned on 16 April.

Presidential ambitions 
The Muhoozi Project has alleged that there is a plan for Muhoozi to become Uganda's next president to succeed his father, the current President of Uganda President Museveni, who has ruled since January 1986 under the National Resistance Movement (NRM). However, there are some who believe that the President's son-in-law and Senior Presidential Advisor for Special Duties, Odrek Rwabwogo, is also interested in succeeding President Museveni, creating two competing camps. It is not clear who the ruling NRM party will back to succeed president Museveni who has not indicated when or if he will leave office.

On 8 March 2022, Muhoozi took to Twitter to announce that he would be retiring from the UPDF, although no timeline for the retirement was given. He said that, "After 28 years of service in my glorious military, the greatest military in the world, I am happy to announce my retirement. Me and my soldiers have achieved so much! I have only love and respect for all those great men and women that achieve greatness for Uganda
everyday." The tweet generated a lot of national and international media attention, with Reuters writing that the move was seen by some as a preparation for the presidency. However, celebrated Ugandan journalist Andrew Mwenda, Muhoozi's friend and long-time confidant, posted a video on his Twitter timeline with Muhoozi a few hours after Muhoozi's retirement tweet, appearing to clarify that the retirement will only come in "exactly eight years" [2030]. Uganda's next presidential election is slated for 2026.

Twitter account deactivation
On April 11, 2022, Muhoozi de-activated his Twitter account which had a verified Twitter handle @mkainerugaba. It was not immediately clear why he de-activated his account but some sources stated that Muhoozi feared that, "there was sabotage against him and that he was being targeted by 'Big Tech' to silence him and his supporters".

Prior to de-activating his account, Muhoozi had put in place plans to celebrate his upcoming 48th birthday with Uganda's Attorney General Kiryowa Kiwanuka as the Chairperson of his 48th birthday organising committee. The list of nearly 28 members of the organizing committee consisted of other very high-profile members of the Uganda society including prominent musicians, army officers, government officials, media personalities and members of parliament.

The unusual approach Muhoozi had taken to using his Twitter handle to comment publicly on somewhat sensitive issues across Uganda and the region placed him and the UPDF under heavy spotlight as he is the Commander Land Forces of the country's armed forces. This came at a time when the UPDF is fighting against prolonged civil conflict in the Karamoja region involving notorious cattle rustlers where Muhoozi threatened to abandon diplomatic channels to ending the conflict promising to bring "hell" to those involved in what he called 'robbery and violence' in Karamoja. At the same time, the UPDF along with DRC forces are fighting against the ADF militant group in Eastern DRC in Operation Shujaa that commenced in November 2021.

On 16 April 2022, five days after deactivating his Twitter account, Muhoozi re-activated it, writing, “Never fear my followers and supporters. I’m back. I had some decisions to make.” It was not immediately clear what those decisions were.
On 3 October 2022 Muhoozi sparked controversy yet again when he tweeted that it would take him two weeks to capture Nairobi, and the next day he was removed from the UPDF lead.

See also
 Katumba Wamala
 David Muhoozi
 Samuel Turyagyenda
 Sam Kutesa
 Caleb Akandwanaho

References

1974 births
Living people
Children of national leaders
People from Kiruhura District
Ugandan generals
People educated at King's College Budo
People educated at St. Mary's College Kisubi
People from Western Region, Uganda
Graduates of the Royal Military Academy Sandhurst
Non-U.S. alumni of the Command and General Staff College
Yoweri Museveni
Egyptian Military Academy alumni